Farah Jane Mendlesohn (born 27 July 1968) is a British academic historian, writer on speculative fiction, and active member of science fiction fandom. Mendlesohn is best-known for their 2008 book Rhetorics of Fantasy, which classifies fantasy literature into four modes based on how the fantastic enters the story. Their work as editor includes the Cambridge Companions to science fiction and fantasy, collaborations with Edward James. The science fiction volume won a Hugo Award. Mendlesohn is also known for books on the history of fantasy, including Children's Fantasy Literature: An Introduction, co-written with Michael Levy. It was the first work to trace the genre's 500-year history and won the World Fantasy Award.

Mendlesohn's academic positions have included a professorship at Anglia Ruskin University. They have served as editor and chair of the science fiction journal Foundation, and as the president of the International Association for the Fantastic in the Arts. In 2015, Mendlesohn received the SFRA Clareson award for distinguished service to the science fiction field.

Scholarly career 

Farah Jane Mendlesohn  was born on 27 July 1968 in Manchester, England. Mendlesohn received a D. Phil. in history from the University of York in 1997.  Mendlesohn's academic positions include a stint as reader in science fiction and fantasy literature in the media department at Middlesex University, and as professor and head of department in the department of English, communication, film and media at Anglia Ruskin University from 2012 to 2017. Mendlesohn joined Staffordshire University in November 2016 as professor and assistant dean in law, policing, forensics & sociology, and is now an associate fellow of the Anglia Ruskin Centre for Science Fiction and Fantasy.

Mendlesohn writes on the history of American religions and British and American science fiction and fantasy. Mendlesohn was the editor of Foundation - The International Review of Science Fiction from 2002 to 2007, and served as its chair from 2004. They then served as president of the International Association for the Fantastic in the Arts from 2008 to 2010. Mendlesohn used to be reviews editor of Quaker Studies.

Mendlesohn's best known work is the 2008 non-fiction book Rhetorics of Fantasy. It proposes a classification of the fantasy genre using the manner in which the fantastic interacts with the real world.

In 2016 Mendlesohn wrote Children's Fantasy Literature: An Introduction with collaborator Michael Levy. The book traces the development of children's fantasy from the 16th to the 21st centuries, covering events such as the collection of folk tales, the impact of world wars, and the emergence of young adult fiction. It was the first work to blend the history of the fantasy and children's literature fields.

Awards and nominations 

In 2005 Mendlesohn won the Hugo Award for Best Related Work for The Cambridge Companion to Science Fiction, which edited with historian Edward James. James and Mendlesohn also edited The Cambridge Companion to Fantasy Literature, released in 2012, and wrote A Short History of Fantasy in 2009. Mendlesohn's book Rhetorics of Fantasy won the BSFA award for best non-fiction book in 2009; the book was also nominated for Hugo and World Fantasy Awards.

In 2010 Mendlesohn was nominated twice for the Best Related Work Hugo, for The Inter-Galactic Playground: A Critical Study of Children's and Teens' Science Fiction, and for On Joanna Russ. They received the Science Fiction Research Association's Clareson award for distinguished service in 2015.

In 2017, they won the World Fantasy Special Award—Professional for Children's Fantasy Literature: An Introduction. Their critical biography of Robert Heinlein (see below) was nominated for the Best Related Work Hugo in 2020. It won the BSFA Award for non-fiction, making them the only writer besides Paul Kincaid to win this award twice.

Science fiction conventions 

Mendlesohn is an active volunteer member of the administration for science fiction conventions. Among other events, they co-chaired ConCussion, the 2006 Eastercon, with Simon Bradshaw; and was director of program for Anticipation, the Montreal World Science Fiction Convention, in 2009; Mendlesohn was on the convention committee of Loncon 3, the 72nd World Science Fiction Convention, but resigned as a protest over the announcement that Jonathan Ross was to be master of ceremonies for the presentation of the Hugo Awards; Mendlesohn remained division head for the convention's exhibits hall.

Heinlein study
In 2017, Mendlesohn announced that a critical study of Robert Heinlein was to be published by the crowdfunding publisher Unbound.  the pledges had exceeded the target by 18%. The book was published in 2019, under the title The Pleasant Profession of Robert A. Heinlein.

Selected works

As author
The Pleasant Profession of Robert A. Heinlein. (Unbound, 2019)
Children's Fantasy Literature: An Introduction (London: Cambridge University Press, 2016) with Michael Levy
A Short History of Fantasy (London: Middlesex University Press, 2009) with Edward James
The Inter-galactic Playground: A Critical Study of Children's and Teens' Science Fiction (Critical Explorations in Science Fiction and Fantasy 14) (Jefferson, NC: McFarland, 2009). .
Rhetorics of Fantasy (Middletown, CT: Wesleyan University Press, 2008)
Diana Wynne Jones: Children's Literature and the Fantastic Tradition (Oxford: Routledge, 2005)
Quaker Relief Work in the Spanish Civil War (Lewiston, N.Y.: Edwin Mellen Press, 2002)

As editor
The Cambridge Companion to Fantasy Literature (Cambridge: Cambridge University Press, 2012) with Edward James
On Joanna Russ (Middletown, CT: Wesleyan University Press, 2009)
Glorifying Terrorism, Manufacturing Contempt: An Anthology of Original Science Fiction (London: Rackstraw Press, 2006)
Polder: A Festschrift For John Clute and Judith Clute (Baltimore: Old Earth Books, 2006)
The Cambridge Companion to Science Fiction (Cambridge: Cambridge University Press, 2003) with Edward James 
The True Knowledge of Ken MacLeod (Reading: Science Fiction Foundation, 2003) with Andrew Butler
The Parliament of Dreams: Conferring on Babylon 5 (Reading: Science Fiction Foundation, 1998) with Edward James

References

Source

External links
 Farah Mendlesohn blog
 about
 archive of earlier home page, archived 2014-04-05)
 
 

1968 births
Living people
British speculative fiction critics
Academics of Middlesex University
Alumni of the University of York
Cultural historians
Historians of the United States
Hugo Award-winning editors
Religion academics
Science fiction academics
Science fiction critics
British women historians